Supernovae have been featured in works of fiction. While a nova is strictly speaking a different type of astronomical event, science fiction writers often use the terms interchangeably and refer to stars "going nova" without further clarification; this can at least partially be explained by the earliest science fiction works featuring these phenomena predating the introduction of the term "supernova" as a separate class of event in 1934. Since these stellar explosions release enormous amounts of energy, some stories propose using them as a power source for extremely energy-intense processes, such as time travel in the Doctor Who serial The Three Doctors from 1972. For the same reason, inducing them is occasionally portrayed as a potential weapon, for instance in the 1966 novel The Solarians by Norman Spinrad.

The prospect of the Sun exploding in this manner has been used in a number of disaster stories, though it was recognized early on that the immense destructive power would leave little to no hope of survival; the 1903 short story "The End of the World" by Simon Newcomb depicts a few survivors in the immediate aftermath, and the 1971 short story "Inconstant Moon" by Larry Niven portrays reactions to the realization that the Sun may have exploded and the end of all human life on Earth consequently being imminent. Once the concept of space travel became widespread in science fiction—thus permitting evacuation of the Earth—stories envisioning such an event to be survivable for human civilization emerged, such as John W. Campbell's 1930 short story "The Voice of the Void". A couple of works such as the 1998 novel Aftermath by Charles Sheffield also depict more distant supernovae threatening Earth. Besides humans, alien civilizations are also subject to the dangers of supernovae in works like the 1967 short story "Day of Burning" by Poul Anderson, where humans try to evacuate a planet inhabited by a pre-spacefaring society threatened by a supernova, and the 1955 short story "The Star" by Arthur C. Clarke where an alien species is found to have gone extinct some two millennia ago when their star exploded.

References

External links
Science Fiction Stories with Good Astronomy and Physics: A Topical Index

Fiction about supernovae